Sunan Kudus (born Ja'far Shadiq; 1500-1550), founder of Kudus, is considered to be one of the Wali Sanga of Java, Indonesia.

He is said to have originated the wayang golek, and founded the masjid at Kudus using (it is said) the doors from the palace of Majapahit.

History 

He was born Ja'far ash-Shadiq, the son of Sunan Ngudung and Syarifah (sibling of Sunan Bonang), thus the grandson of Sunan Ampel. It is said that he was the son of an Egyptian sultan who had migrated to Java. In the Sultanate of Demak, he was appointed commander of the army. He went forth with Sultan Prawata, battling against Adipati Jipang and Arya Penangsang.

See also

Islam in Indonesia
The spread of Islam in Indonesia (1200 to 1600)
Ali al-Uraidhi ibn Ja'far al-Sadiq

References

Sources
Sunyoto, Agus (2014). Atlas Wali Songo: Buku Pertama yang Mengungkap Wali Songo Sebagai Fakta Sejarah. 6th edition. Depok: Pustaka IIMaN; 

Wali Sanga
1550 deaths
Year of birth unknown
1500 births
 City founders